James Birch may refer to:
 James Birch (curator), English art dealer and gallery owner
 James E. Birch (entrepreneur) (1827–1857), American stagecoach line founder
 James Birch (footballer) (1888–1940), English footballer 
James H. Birch (fl. 1841) American slave trader
 James W. W. Birch (1826–1875), British colonial official
 James Birch (politician) (1849–1941), Canadian merchant, horse breeder and political figure in Prince Edward Island
 Sir James Frederick Noel Birch (1865–1939), known as Noel Birch, British cavalry officer
 Jim Birch (rugby union) (1898–1968), English-born rugby union player
 James Birch (racing driver) (born 1989), British racing driver
 James Alfred Birch (1888–1969), British philatelist
 James Birch (sectary) (died 1795?), Welsh sectary
 James Harvey Birch, Missouri politician and judge